Czermno may refer to several places:
Czermno, Kuyavian-Pomeranian Voivodeship (north-central Poland)
Czermno, Lublin Voivodeship (east Poland)
Czermno, Świętokrzyskie Voivodeship (south-central Poland)
Czermno, Masovian Voivodeship (east-central Poland)
 Czermno Kolonia-Stomorgi

See also
 Czermno-Kolonia, Świętokrzyskie Voivodeship, in south-central Poland
Czermna (disambiguation)